Kolta is a village and municipality in the Nové Zámky District in the Nitra Region of southwest Slovakia.

History 
In historical records the village was first mentioned in 1337.

Geography 
The village lies at an altitude of 175 metres and covers an area of 25.854 km². It has a population of about 1,644 people.

Demographics 
The population is about 96% Slovak and 4% Hungarian.

Facilities 
The village has a public library and a football pitch.

Genealogical resources

The records for genealogical research are available at the state archive "Statny Archiv in Nitra, Slovakia"

 Roman Catholic church records (births/marriages/deaths): 1725-1787 (parish B)
 Lutheran church records (births/marriages/deaths): 1785-1896 (parish B)
 Reformated church records (births/marriages/deaths): 1815-1945 (parish B)

See also
 List of municipalities and towns in Slovakia

References

External links 
Kolta – Nové Zámky Okolie
Surnames of living people in Kolta

Villages and municipalities in Nové Zámky District